Solhan is a department or commune of Yagha Province in the Sahel Region of northern Burkina Faso.

A massacre occurred in Solhan in June 2021.

References 

Departments of Burkina Faso
Yagha Province